Solarbabies (also known as Solarwarriors and Solarfighters) is a 1986 American science fiction film, made by Brooksfilms and released by Metro-Goldwyn-Mayer. It was the second and final film directed by Alan Johnson, who is better known for his work as a choreographer.

Plot
In a bleak post-apocalyptic future, most of Earth's water has been placed under containment by the Eco Protectorate, a paramilitary organization, who governs the planet's new order. Orphan children, mostly teenagers, live in orphanages created by the Protectorate, designed to indoctrinate new recruits into their service. The orphans play a rough sport which is a hybrid of lacrosse and roller-hockey. Playing is the only thing that unites them other than the futile attempts of the Protectorate to control them. These orphans are Jason, the group's leader (Jason Patric), Terra (Jami Gertz), Tug (Peter DeLuise), Rabbit (Claude Brooks), Metron (James LeGros), and a young deaf boy named Daniel (Lukas Haas).

While hiding in a cave, Daniel finds a mysterious orb with special powers. The orb is an alien intelligence called Bodhi, who miraculously restores Daniel's hearing and has other powers, such as creating rain indoors. Another orphan, Darstar (Adrian Pasdar), takes the orb, hoping that he will be able to use it. He leaves the orphanage on roller skates and Daniel soon follows. The rest of the group chase after Daniel. The E-police learn of Bodhi while chasing the teens and catch Darstar with the sphere. The teens are eventually rescued by a band of older outlaws called the Eco Warriors. They have retired from fighting and are led by Terra's long-lost father, Greentree (Frank Converse). The teens leave the Eco Warriors and using their roller skating skills, break into the Protectorate's high security Water Storage Building. The teens discover the E-Police are trying to destroy Bodhi and they manage to recover the alien, but as soon as they do the sphere dematerializes and destroys the facility, releasing the water back to where it belongs as they rush out. As they all gather on a nearby hillside, Bodhi sparks the first thunderstorm the teens have ever seen and returns to space, but not without leaving a bit of himself behind in each of them.

Ultimately, in the closing credits, the orphans are seen swimming together in the newly-restored ocean, Darstar being fully accepted into the group and Jason and Terra sharing a kiss.

Cast
Richard Jordan as Grock
Jami Gertz as Terra
Jason Patric as Jason
Lukas Haas as Daniel
James LeGros as Metron
 Claude Brooks as Rabbit
Peter DeLuise as Tug
 Peter Kowanko as Gavial
Adrian Pasdar as Darstar
Sarah Douglas as Shandray
Charles Durning as The Warden
Frank Converse as Greentree
Terrence Mann as Ivor
Alexei Sayle as Malice
Bruce Payne as Dogger
Willoughby Gray as Canis

Production
Executive producer Mel Brooks explained how Solarbabies was made in an episode of the podcast How Did This Get Made? Co-writer Metrov was also interviewed for a How Did This Get Made? article for Slashfilm.

Metrov was inspired by the "guerrilla filmmaking" methods of his friend Abel Ferrara to create a low-budget film of his own. He subsequently wrote a 32-page treatment for a science fiction film about a group of children he dubbed the "Little Rascals of the future." The treatment caught the attention of veteran screenwriter Walon Green, and Mark Johnson, an employee for Mel Brooks. To pitch the film to potential investors, Metrov filmed a 12-minute slideshow with random kids playing the parts.

Metrov's presentation caught the attention of Brooks, who agreed to make it in Spain due to the lack of unions and cheaper production costs. Brooks also gave Metrov the director's chair. The production was greenlit with a $5 million budget, but Brooks was persuaded by his colleagues to increase the budget under the belief that it had greater potential. An additional $20 million was eventually required to complete the film. Because Metrov had no experience directing a big-budget film, Alan Johnson was hired as a replacement.

The beginning of the shoot encountered delays because of unexpected heavy rains. Later, director Alan Johnson and the cast had so many disagreements that Brooks flew to the set and ordered the cast to get back to work or be fired. Brooks recounted how a number of sequences Johnson shot didn't make sense, or had poor coloration, and more money was needed for additional filming. Finally, more money was needed at the end for special effects.

When production began, Brooks had invested approximately $1.5 million of his own money. As production delays mounted, he invested more, eventually taking out a second mortgage on his home. Brooks was forced to raise an additional $15 million through banks.

Brooks was worried the movie could not be saved, so he cut together a 10-minute trailer for the movie in a sci-fi style similar to Star Wars in order to sell to distributors. When Brooks approached Paramount, Michael Eisner showed interest, but Jeffrey Katzenberg said no. Eventually, Alan Ladd Jr. at MGM agreed to distribute the movie, and connected Brooks with international distributor UIP. The distributor purchased the movie from Brooks for $14 million.

After paying back investors and loans, Brooks estimates he had lost about $9 million of his own money at the time. However, Brooks claimed that over the years since its release, the movie finally did break even, most likely through home video and DVD. Brooks called it a "miracle."

Release
Solarbabies was released in the United States on November 26, 1986. In the Philippines, the film was released with the same name by Movierama International on June 23, 1989.

Critical response
Reviews for Solarbabies were very poor, with film historian Leonard Maltin describing it thus: "An appalling stinker; the 1980's teen jargon doesn't exactly capture the futuristic mood of this junk." The film was given a BOMB rating in his annual publication.

Joe Kane, the "Phantom of the Movies", called the picture "A pathetic Mad Max Beyond Thunderdome rip-off, working from a script which must have been scrawled in Crayola, with every futuristic cliché you could possibly imagine. Lacking in originality, but rich in brain-dead dialogue; when Jami Gertz snarls, 'Get out, you creature of filth!', consider that a subliminal message."

Mike Clark, reviewing the film for USA Today, had this message for the filmmakers: "Better pray for a pox on Spock, guys, and fast" (the film was released on the same day as Star Trek IV: The Voyage Home), and added "...we see in a couple of scenes that movies still exist. I'd have thought both civilization and the movies would have been wiped out by '41 [the year in the future the movie is set], thanks to atrocities like Solarbabies."

Gene Siskel, on his syndicated film review show Siskel & Ebert, called the film "trash."

Home media
It was released on DVD on March 6, 2007. The movie was later given a Blu-ray release, first in Germany on September 25, 2014 by Koch Media and in the US on May 10, 2016 by Kino Lorber.

References

External links
 at MGM.com

1986 films
1980s science fiction adventure films
1980s dystopian films
American science fiction adventure films
Brooksfilms films
Films directed by Alan Johnson (choreographer)
Films produced by Mel Brooks
Films scored by Maurice Jarre
Films set in the 30th century
Films shot in Almería
Films shot in Madrid
Metro-Goldwyn-Mayer films
American post-apocalyptic films
Roller skating films
1980s English-language films
1980s American films